Boiga barnesii is a species of cat snake endemic to Sri Lanka. It is known as Barnes' cat snake in English and -පදුරු මාපිලා in Sinhala. It is a member of the snake family Colubridae. Barnes' cat snake is mainly a forest-dwelling species but may occasionally be found in human habitats. Being a nocturnal and an arboreal hunter, it mainly feeds on agamid lizards and geckos. The day time is usually spent inside a tree hole or a crevice. It’s a very timid and a mildly venomous snake and rarely attempts to bite.

Etymology
The specific name, barnesii, is in honor of Richard Hawksworth Barnes (born 1831), who collected specimens in Ceylon (now Sri Lanka) for the British Museum (Natural History), including the type specimen of this species.

Scalation
B. barnesii has 19 scale rows at midbody. It has 2–3 Pre-oculars. The ventrals number 208–271, and the subcaudals number 98–120.

Description
The dorsum of B. barnesii is reddish-brown, with a purplish brown vertebral series of blotches running from nape to the mid-tail region. A lateral series of the same color also can be seen. The head is purplish black, with a light gray post-ocular stripe. The ventral surface is creamy, with gray or brown spots.

Toxicity
Although  is only mildly venomous, and bites on humans produce only local symptoms, there is a common misconception in Sri Lanka that all -මාපිලා (cat snakes) are highly venomous and could kill a human with its venom. This misconception may be because the name  refers to different species in different parts of the island. Both krait species mentioned (Bungarus caeruleus and Bungarus ceylonicus) are highly venomous.

See also
 Boiga ceylonensis (Sri Lanka Cat Snake)

References

External links
http://species.wikimedia.org/wiki/Boiga_barnesii
http://animaldiversity.ummz.umich.edu/site/accounts/classification/Boiga_barnesii.html
http://www.pdn.ac.lk/socs/zaup/reptiles/colubridae.html

Further reading
 (1896). Catalogue of the Snakes in the British Museum (Natural History). Volume III., Containing the Colubridæ (Opisthoglyphæ and Proteroglyphæ), Amblycephalidæ, and Viperidæ. London: Trustees of the British Museum (Natural History). (Taylor and Francis, printers). xiv + 727 pp. + Plates I-XXV. (Dipsadomorphus barnesii, pp. 73–74).
 (1943). The Fauna of British India, Ceylon and Burma, Including the Whole of the Indo-Chinese Sub-region. Reptilia and Amphibia. Vol. III.—Serpentes. London: Secretary of State for India. (Taylor and Francis, printers). xii + 583 pp. ("Boiga barnesi [sic]", pp. 354–355).
 (2005). "A new species of genus Boiga (Serpentes: Colubridae: Colubrinae) from Sri Lanka". Russian Journal of Herpetology 12 (3): 213-222.
 (1921). Ophidia Taprobanica or the Snakes of Ceylon. Colombo, Ceylon: Colombo Museum. (H.R. Cottle, Government Printer). xxii + 581 pp. ("Dipsadomorphus barnesi [sic]", pp. 283–285).
 (1955). A Colored atlas of some Vertebrates from Ceylon. Vol. 3; Serpentoid Reptilia. Colombo: Ceylon National Museums. 121 pp. + 49 plates.
 (2005). A Photographic Guide to Snakes and other Reptiles of Sri Lanka. London: New Holland Publishers (UK) Ltd. 144 pp.
 (2006). Sri Lankawe Sarpayin [The Snakes of Sri Lanka]. Wildlife Heritage Trust of Sri Lanka. 297 pp. (in Sinhala).

Boiga
Snakes of Asia
Reptiles of Sri Lanka
Endemic fauna of Sri Lanka
Reptiles described in 1869
Taxa named by Albert Günther